Never Gone is a 2005 album by the Backstreet Boys.

Never Gone may also refer to:
 
 Never Gone (film), a 2016 Chinese romantic drama film
Never Gone (TV series), a 2018 Chinese streaming television series
 "Never Gone" (Colton Dixon song), 2012
 "Never Gone" (Andee song), 2014

See also
 Never Gone Tour, the promotional concert tour accompanying the above-mentioned Backstreet Boys album
 Never Been Gone, a 2009 album by Carly Simon